The Ridenhower Formation is a geologic formation in Illinois. It preserves fossils dating back to the Carboniferous period.

See also

 List of fossiliferous stratigraphic units in Illinois

References
 

Carboniferous Illinois
Carboniferous southern paleotropical deposits